Xevious is a franchise of shoot 'em up video games published by Bandai Namco Entertainment, formerly Namco. Xevious, the first title in the franchise, was released for arcades in January 1983 in Japan and a month later in North America by Atari, Inc. It was created by Masanobu Endō, who also designed The Tower of Druaga. The game has received many sequels, spin-offs, and re-imaginings, the most recent being Xevious Resurrection in 2009. Xevious games have been ported to many platforms and compiled into several Namco compilations. The franchise contains twelve games—seven mainline entries and five spin-offs—soundtrack albums, pachinko machines, and an animated feature film produced by Groove Corporation.

Gameplay in the series consists of controlling a spaceship named the Solvalou throughout a series of levels, shooting at enemies and avoiding their projectiles. The Solvalou has two weapons, an air zapper that destroys air-based enemies and a blaster bomb that destroys ground-based enemies. Later games introduce mechanics such as additional playable ships, power-ups, protective shields, and two-player co-operative play. Critics have labeled Xevious as one of the most important games of its kind. It is one of the first vertically scrolling shooters and among the first video games to implement bosses, pre-rendered visuals, and a cohesive world and storyline. Xevious inspired games such as Gradius, TwinBee, Zanac, and RayForce. It has had an influence on game designers such as Satoshi Tajiri and musicians like Haruomi Hosono.

Video games

Other media

Soundtracks

References

Mass media by franchise
Media lists by video games franchise